Ginnheim is a quarter of Frankfurt am Main, Germany. It is part of the Ortsbezirk Mitte-Nord.

References

Districts of Frankfurt